Tareq Ihab Helmy aka Reda El-Weshi (Arabic:) (born 1 March 1985) is an Egyptian football striker, currently playing for Barazeely Merghany, he is a former player for Egyptian side El-Ahly, Al-Mokawloon Al-Arab and Telephonat Bani Sweif
in feb 2013 signed a contract with Al-Quwa Al-Jawiya Iraq Premier league played 13 game scored 7 goals now Reda join with Karbala Iraq Premier league season 2013-2014 played 3 game scored 1 goals.

References

1985 births
Living people
Al Mokawloon Al Arab SC players
Al Ahly SC players
Egyptian footballers
Al-Faisaly SC players
Sportspeople from Alexandria
Egyptian expatriate footballers
Egyptian expatriate sportspeople in Iraq
Expatriate footballers in Iraq
Egyptian expatriate sportspeople in Jordan
Expatriate footballers in Jordan
Egyptian expatriate sportspeople in Saudi Arabia
Expatriate footballers in Saudi Arabia
Talaba SC players
Al-Mina'a SC players
Al-Quwa Al-Jawiya players
Jeddah Club players
Saudi First Division League players
Egyptian Premier League players
Association football forwards
Telephonat Beni Suef SC players